Akul Balaji (born Akula Balaji on 23 February 1979) is an Indian actor, television host and dancer who has worked in both Kannada and Telugu languages. He started his career by acting and hosting television shows and has participated in the Kannada Film Industry for almost a decade. He shot to fame for co-hosting the hit Kannada reality show Pyate Hudgir Halli Lifu  on Asianet Suvarna Channel, with Kannada Star Sudeep. He recently hosted a Kannada dance reality show named Takadhimita on Colors Kannada Channel.

In 2014, by public vote, Akul won the second season of game show Bigg Boss Kannada – the Indian version of Celebrity Big Brother and currently produced by Endemol India

Early and personal life 
Originally from a small town called Rly. Kodur in Andhra Pradesh, Akul Balaji was born on 23 February 1979. After moving to Bangalore at age 16, he trained in Bharathanatyam under Smt. Usha Datar and later joined "Natya STEM Dance Kampni", headed by Madhu Nataraj as a contemporary dancer and learned Kathak from Guru Smt. Dr. Maya Rao. He has also dabbled in theater in Director Pawan Kumar's adaptation of Badal Sarkar's Evam Inderjit in 2004. He has also done an advance acting workshop under Mahesh Dattani. Akul Balaji married in 2008. The couple have a son. His name is Krishaan Nag Akul.

Career 
From beginnings as a small screen actor, he has become an actor and television host in Karnataka. He had won "The most popular anchor award" by Big FM Big TV for the year 2010  and he has to his credit superhit shows like Kuniyonu Baara and Comedy Killadigalu on Zee Kannada. He has hosted super hit reality shows for Asianet Suvarna like Pyate Hudgir Halli Lifu season 1 & 2, Halli Haida Pyateg Banda, Pyate Mandi Kadige Bandru 1, Pyate Mandi Kaadige Bandru 2, which was shot in Andaman Islands, Hosa Luv Story, and Nodi Swamy Naavirode Heege. He hosted Mane Munde Mahalakshmi, a game show for ETV Kannada and Indian. He hosted Sye Ante Sye for Zee Telugu. He also hosted the reality show called Thakadimitha Dancing Stars  for ETV Kannada. He has acted in the television series Agatha (2002), Guptha Gamini, Yava Janumadha Maithri , Jagalagantiyaru, Pellinati Pramanalu (2012). He made a comeback in the Telugu television industry in 2021 with Oohalu Gusagusalade.

Filmography

Television

Films

References

External links 

 

Living people
1979 births
Indian male film actors
Male actors in Kannada cinema
Male actors in Telugu cinema
Reality show winners
Participants in Indian reality television series
People from Kadapa district
Male actors from Andhra Pradesh
Big Brother (franchise) winners
Bigg Boss Kannada contestants
21st-century Indian male actors
Male actors in Telugu television
Telugu male actors